Bibhu Padhi, born Bibhu Prasad Padhi, on 16 January 1951, is an Indian poet. He writes in English and Odia, and is also a translator and literary critic.

Early life 
Padhi was born on 16 January 1951 in Cuttack, Odisha. He studied at Ravenshaw Collegiate School and Ranihat High School, Cuttack, then joined Ravenshaw College, Cuttack (now Ravenshaw University), for a Bachelor of Arts degree in English literature in 1969 and Master of Arts in English literature in 1971. He received a Doctor of Letters (D.Litt.) from Utkal University in 1991 in English literature. He is married to Minakshi Padhi, a writer and academic.

Career 
Padhi served on the faculty of several colleges in Odisha, including Regional College of Education (now Regional Institute of Education), Ravenshaw College and BJB College, where he taught English Literature. He was also a Counsellor in Creative Writing for the Odisha branch of Indira Gandhi National Open University from 1986 to 1990. He has 17 volumes of poetry in English and 5 volumes of poetry in Odia. His poems have been included in numerous anthologies. He has also authored a novel, called Absences.

Bibliography
Poetry
Going to the Temple (New Delhi: Indus, 1988; rpt. New Delhi: Authorspress, 2008) 
A Wound Elsewhere (New Delhi: Rupa, 1992)
Lines from A Legend (Leeds, UK: Peepal Tree Press, 1993)
Painting the House (Hyderabad, India: Orient Longman, 1999)
Games the Heart Must Play: a trilogy in of love poems (Bhubaneshwar,: Pen & Ink, 2003) 
Choosing A Place (New Delhi: Gnosis/Authorspress, 2011)
Migratory Days (New Delhi: Authorspress, 2011)
Brief Seasons: 60 love songs, (Bhubaneswar, Timepass, 2013)
Magic Ritual (New Delhi: Authorspress, 2014)
 Midnight Diary (New Delhi: Authorspress, 2015) 
 Sea Dreams (New Delhi Authorspress, 2017)
 Small Wants: Selected Poems (New Delhi: Authorspress, 2018)
 All That Was and Is: Poems Inspired by Upanishads (New Delhi: HarperCollins, 2019)
 A History of Things (New  Delhi: Authorspress, 2020)
 Going Easy (New  Delhi: Signorina Publications, 2020)
 A Friendship with Time (Kolkata: Hornbill Press, 2021) 
 Principles of Sleep (New Delhi: Red River, 2021)

Chapbook

 Living with Lorenzo: Poems on D H Lawrence (Cuttack: Peacock Books, 2003)

Novel

 Absences (New Delhi: Authorspress, 2014)

Other works
D H Lawrence: Modes of Fictional Style (Albany, NY, USA: Whitston, 1989) 
Indian Philosophy and Religion: A Reader’s Guide (Jefferson, NC, USA & London, England: McFarland, 1990; rpt. New Delhi: D K Printworld, 1999;  2nd rpt. DK Printworld, 2004) [with Minakshi Padhi]
D H Lawrence: New Essays from India (New Delhi: Atlantic, forthcoming)

Translations
A Morning of Rains and Other Poems: Selected Poems of Sitakant Mahapatra (New Delhi: Vikas, 1990) [Mahapatra is a recipient of India’s highest literary award, the "Bharatiya Gyanapith"].
Memories, Legends, and the Goddess: Selected Poems of Bibek Jena, (Bhubaneswar, 2013) 
Parallel Speech: An Anthology of Fifteen Younger Contemporary Oriya Poets (New Delhi: Authorspress)

See also 
 Indian English Literature
 Sitakant Mahapatra
 List of Indian poets

References

https://epaper.thestatesman.com/m5/3146767/Kolkata-The-Statesman/01-ST-JULY-2021#page/11/1

Jaydeep Sarangi Interview with Bibhu Padhi,JSL,JNU Journal,Spring 2006.Link:https://web.archive.org/web/20160304222839/http://www.jnu.ac.in/SLLCS/JSL%20V.htm

Living people
Indian male poets
Poets from Odisha
1951 births
English-language poets from India
People from Cuttack